The Tai Tam Waterworks Heritage Trail is a heritage trail in Hong Kong that comprises 22 waterworks structures with historical value near the Tai Tam group of reservoirs. The Trail is about 5 km long and takes about two hours to complete. The Trail is located along the Tai Tam Reservoir Road with entrance at Wong Nai Chung Gap near Hong Kong Parkview or at the junction of Tai Tam Road and Tai Tam Reservoir Road. Ten information stations were established en route to introduce the functions and historic values of the structures. Guided tours will be organised for schools and non-profit making organisations.

Entrance (Tai Tam Road):  
Entrance (Parkview): 

A total of 41 pre-World War II waterworks structures located in six reservoir areas, namely Pok Fu Lam Reservoir, Tai Tam Group of Reservoirs, Wong Nai Chung Reservoir, Kowloon Reservoir, Shing Mun (Jubilee) Reservoir and Aberdeen Reservoir, were declared as monuments in September 2009, to recognise the heritage value of waterworks facilities built in pre-war era. The Trail was established for the declared monuments in the Tai Tam Group of Reservoirs to help the public appreciate the history of water supply and the waterworks structures in Hong Kong. Among the six reservoirs, Wong Nai Chung Reservoir has been converted into a boating park since 1986, while the other reservoirs are still operating.

History and significance
The Tai Tam group of reservoirs includes the Tai Tam Reservoir, Tai Tam Byewash Reservoir, the Tai Tam Intermediate Reservoir and the Tai Tam Tuk Reservoir. They were built under the Tai Tam Valley Scheme and Tai Tam Tuk Scheme serving an aggregate capacity of 9 million cubic metre to meet the ever-increasing demands of water. Upon completion, pressure of water demands from urbanisation spread, from central and western districts to the eastern side of Hong Kong Island, was gradually released.

The Tai Tam Reservoir is the second oldest and largest reservoir built on Hong Kong Island in the Tai Tam Country Park in Hong Kong East by the British colonial government. The project lasted from 1883 till 1888, costing $1,250,000.

The Tai Tam Reservoir was important to the early development of Hong Kong. Its water catered for the needs of water, even present day Central, Wanchai, Causeway Bay, North Point and Shau Kei Wan. Easing the water demands of central, the reservoir moved the city further to the east. Urban area consequently expanded and spread to the eastern side of the island.

Water resources was still tight in Hong Kong in the early 1900s. Thus, the colonial government conducted The Extension of the Tai Tam Water Supply System. The project was divided into two phases. Phase II started in 1913. The Tai Tam Water Supply System could basically meet the needs of the Hong Kong Island at that time. The Tai Tam Group of Reservoirs is a reminiscence of the water supply history of early Hong Kong.

Characteristics
The reservoir structures are regarded as a kind of Utilitarian engineering structures influenced by Italianate Renaissance of Victorian civil engineering. Therefore, they are considered having heritage value and are kept intact.

With regard to the engineering techniques used, the system used in Tai Tam Reservoir relied much less on gravity flow, which only accounted for about 20% of the total capacity of the ultimate fresh water supply. It was built using a more advanced engineering techniques than those used in building the Pokfulam one, as the system of Pokfulam Reservoir relied completely on a simple principle based on gravity – water running down from a higher place to a lower one.

Historical structures of the trail
The trail is an example of conservation and revitalisation of Hong Kong heritage. There are many waterworks structures with precious historic value in the Tai Tam group of reservoirs along the trail, the following ones have been declared monuments including valve houses, bridges, staff quarters etc. This revitalisation project is different from other past projects in the sense that no extra resources is required to be put onto it.

Photographics for every structures listed below are available on the website of the Conserve and Revitalise Hong Kong Heritage. They are collectively called: "22 Historic Structures of Tai Tam Group of Reservoirs".

Guided tour
Guided tour for Tai Tam Waterworks Heritage Trail is introduced by the Commissioner for Heritage's Office in late September 2009 to encourage young people (only 12–18-year-old people can join the tour) to appreciate these centenary monuments and learn more about the history of Hong Kong's water supply.

Most of the facilities in the Tai Tam Waterworks Heritage are intact and still operating now, although some (Tai Tam Tuk Raw water Pumping Station and its Chimney Shaft) are not accessible to the public. However, participants of guided tour are allowed to visit them.

Between 10 October 2009 and 19 December 2009, there will be guided tours at Tai Tam Waterworks Heritage Trail every Saturday morning, starting at 10.30am and 11.30am respectively. The tour is about 5 km long and lasts for about two hours. It will start at Tai Tam Reservoir Road (near Parkview) and end at Tai Tam Tuk Raw Water Pumping Station.

See also
 Heritage conservation in Hong Kong
Heritage Trails in Hong Kong
List of Grade I historic buildings in Hong Kong
List of Grade II historic buildings in Hong Kong
List of Grade III historic buildings in Hong Kong
 Tai Tam Country Park
 History of Hong Kong

References

External links

 Water for a Barren Rock, Water Supplies Department
 Wsd.gov.hk
 The-sun.on.cc
 Hkdailynews.com.hk

Buildings and structures in Hong Kong
Declared monuments of Hong Kong
Heritage trails